Pennsylvania Route 290 (designated by the Pennsylvania Department of Transportation as SR 290) is a  state highway located in the environs of Erie, Pennsylvania. The western terminus of the route is at Interstate 79 and Pennsylvania Route 5 in the neighborhood of Dock Junction. The eastern terminus is at Interstate 90 and Pennsylvania Route 430 southeast of downtown in Harborcreek Township.

Route description

PA 290 officially begins at I-79 exit 183, less than a quarter of a mile from where I-79 terminates at the Bayfront Parkway. After exiting the off-ramps, PA 290 embarks on a concurrency with PA 5 eastward through downtown Erie on 12th Street, passing south of Louis J. Tullio Arena and UPMC Park in the heart of downtown. At the Bayfront Connector, an extension of the Bayfront Parkway that opened on June 17, 2005, PA 290 breaks from PA 5 and turns to the east onto the Connector.

As part of the Bayfront Connector, PA 290 interchanges with U.S. Route 20 a mile from PA 5 prior to following the Connector out of the city. Roughly a mile northwest of I-90, the Connector passes north of Penn State Behrend and merges into PA 430, creating a concurrency between PA 290 and PA 430. The two routes remain conjoined to I-90 exit 32, where PA 290 terminates on the southeast side of the interchange.

History 
The highway was formed in order to create a high-speed loop for traffic between I-90 and I-79, which begins at the end of the Bayfront Parkway, as well as to help promote the 12th Street corridor as a viable alternate route to the congested Bayfront Parkway.

Major intersections

Bayfront Connector

At the intersection of East 12th Street, the Bayfront Parkway becomes the Bayfront Connector and picks up the concurrency with Pennsylvania Route 290.  After it bridges the railroad tracks owned by CSX, the Connector parallels the tracks for Norfolk Southern. The Connector intersects East 38th Street at angle, prohibiting turns onto 38th Street. After the intersection of Shannon Road, the Bayfront Connector stops paralleling railroad tracks and crosses Fourmile Creek over the Wintergreen Gorge Bridge. The concurrency for Pennsylvania Route 430 begins at the intersection with Station Road. The entrance to Penn State Erie is on the Connector at the intersection for Hannon Road and Knowledge Parkway. The Bayfront Connector terminates, along with PA 290, at the I-90 interchange, while PA 430 continues as Station Road.

See also

Notes 

a. The  segment from the Bayfront Parkway to East 12th Street, which was built as part of the East Side Access Highway project, was counted as part of the Connector but is signed and designated as part of the Parkway.

References

External links 

Pennsylvania Highways: PA 290
 The Erie East Side Access Highway (PennDOT/FHWA), archived by Internet Archive

290
Transportation in Erie County, Pennsylvania
Expressways in the United States
Transportation in Erie, Pennsylvania